Minuscule 178 (in the Gregory-Aland numbering), ε 210 (Soden), is a Greek minuscule manuscript of the New Testament, on parchment. Palaeographically it has been assigned to the 12th century. It has marginalia.

Description 

The codex contains an almost complete text of the four Gospels on 272 thick parchment leaves (size ), with only one small lacuna (John 21:17-25). The leaves are arranged in quarto. The text is written in two columns per page, in 23 lines per page, in dark-brown ink, capital letters in gold.

There is also a division according to the Ammonian Sections (in Mark 234 sections - the last in 16:9), but without references to the Eusebian Canons.

The headings of the Gospels as in minuscule 69 – εκ του κατα Μαρκον.

On the first leaf it has the same subscription as codex 87.

Text 

Kurt Aland did not place the Greek text of the codex in any Category.

According to the Claremont Profile Method it represents the textual family Πa in Luke 1 and Luke 10. In Luke 20 it represents Kx.

The text of the Pericope Adulterae (John 7:53-8:11) is marked by an obelus.

History 

Formerly the manuscript was held in της μονης του προδρομου της κοιμενης εγγιστα της Αετιου αρχαικη δε τη μονη κησις πετρα in Constantinople, as codices 87 and 774.

The manuscript came from Constantinople. According to the subscription "prope Cisternam Aeti".

It was examined by Bianchini, Birch (about 1782), and Scholz. C. R. Gregory saw it in 1886.

It is currently housed at the Biblioteca Angelica (gr. 123), at Rome.

See also 

 List of New Testament minuscules
 Biblical manuscript
 Textual criticism

Notes

References

Further reading 

 Georgius Codinus, De antiquitatibus, Bonn 1843.

External links 
 Angelicus gr. 123 Nuova Biblioteca Manoscritta

Greek New Testament minuscules
12th-century biblical manuscripts